Jessica Thomas is a netball player.

Jessica Thomas may also refer to:

Jessica Thomas, character played by Alicia Silverstone, see List of The Wonder Years episodes
Jessica Thomas, see History of Ashland, Kentucky#Controversies

See also
Jessie Thomas, educator
Jesse Thomas (disambiguation)